Peter Matthews or Mathews may refer to:

Peter Matthews (rebel) (1789–1838), hanged for treason in 1838 after the Upper Canada Rebellion
Peter Matthews (sprinter) (born 1989), Jamaican sprinter
Peter H. Matthews (1873–1916), American operator of policy gambling
Peter Matthews (police officer) (1917–2003), British Chief Constable
Peter Hugoe Matthews (born 1934), British linguist
Peter Matthews (printmaker) (born 1942), British printmaker
Peter Mathews (archaeologist) (born 1951), Australian Mayanist
Peter Matthews (physiologist), British physiologist
Peter Mathews (politician) (1951–2017), Irish politician
Peter Mathews (Left Behind), fictional character in Left Behind
Peter Matthews (artist) (born 1978), English artist
Peter Mathews Memorial Skate Garden, a skatepark named in honor of a local skater who died tragically